Eleanor Butler (also known as Nell Butler or Irish Nell; born c. 1665) was an indentured white woman who married an enslaved African man in colonial Maryland in 1681.

Biography
Butler, who was of Irish origin, was an indentured servant to Charles Calvert, 3rd Baron Baltimore. At around 16 years of age she announced her intention to marry a man referred to only as "Negro Charles". A 1664 Maryland law outlined the legal status of a free woman who voluntarily married an enslaved man: she would serve the master of her husband until his death, and any offspring of their union would be born into slavery. Despite this, Butler was determined to be wed. The thought of a white woman becoming enslaved apparently distressed Lord Baltimore, and he warned against the union for that reason.

Lord Baltimore petitioned Maryland's provincial assembly to change the 1664 law, and in 1681 key provisions of the law were in fact repealed. The new law additionally outlawed marriages between female servants and enslaved men, and provided for huge punitive fines to be levied on the enslaver ("master") of any enslaved person thus wed.

Butler and Charles apparently married in 1681, but this happened before the law went into effect. Because the new law did not apply retroactively, and perhaps also because Lord Baltimore left Maryland indefinitely in 1684, Butler and Charles lived out the rest of their lives enslaved by William Boarman, Eleanor Butler's husband's enslaver. They had seven or eight children, all born after the repeal of the 1664 law, but they were nonetheless born enslaved. One son, Jack, apparently escaped and later bought his freedom from the Boarman family. The rest remained as human chattel.

In October 1770, two of their descendants, William and Mary Butler, still enslaved, filed suit for their freedom on the basis they were descendants of a white woman. Mary Butler was Nell Butler's great granddaughter, but the provincial court ruled against them, noting that "many of these people, if turned loose, cannot mix with us and become members of society." Other suits from other descendants followed in the 1780s. In 1787, the daughter of William and Mary Butler – also named Mary – successfully sued for her freedom, but hers was a procedural victory devoid of any particular precedent. While her attorney hoped that the court would decide that any descendant of a white woman could not be enslaved, such a decision and the far-reaching effects it would have brought were not forthcoming. Instead, the court ruled that as no evidence existed of a legal union between Nell Butler and Negro Charles, the provisions of the 1664 law that condemned her and her offspring to slavery should not have applied in her case. This compromise ruling allowed Mary Butler her freedom without having any significant effect on property rights in the state.

Notes

See also

 Agnes Kane Callum

External Links
 Butler Family Tree - six generations of Butler's matrilineal descendants, showing the eventual impact of the freedom suits, from the Reginald F. Lewis Museum of Maryland African American History & Culture

References 

1660s births
Multiracial affairs in the United States
Intercultural and interracial relationships
People of colonial Maryland
17th-century American slaves
Colonial American women
American indentured servants
Kingdom of Ireland emigrants to the Thirteen Colonies
Irish-American culture in Maryland
Year of death unknown
Place of birth missing
Place of death missing
17th-century American women